In graph theory, the Lovász conjecture (1969) is a classical problem on Hamiltonian paths in graphs. It says:
 Every finite connected vertex-transitive graph contains a Hamiltonian path.
Originally László Lovász stated the problem in the opposite way, but
this version became standard.  In 1996, László Babai published a conjecture sharply contradicting this conjecture, but both conjectures remain widely open. It is not even known if a single counterexample would necessarily lead to a series of counterexamples.

Historical remarks 
The problem of finding Hamiltonian paths in highly symmetric graphs is quite old. As Donald Knuth describes it in volume 4 of The Art of Computer Programming, the problem originated in British campanology (bell-ringing). Such Hamiltonian paths and cycles are also closely connected to Gray codes. In each case the constructions are explicit.

Variants of the Lovász conjecture

Hamiltonian cycle 
Another version of Lovász conjecture states that
 Every finite connected vertex-transitive graph contains a Hamiltonian cycle except the five known counterexamples.

There are 5 known examples of vertex-transitive graphs with no Hamiltonian cycles (but with Hamiltonian paths): the complete graph , the Petersen graph, the Coxeter graph and two graphs derived from the Petersen and Coxeter graphs by replacing each vertex with a triangle.

Cayley graphs
None of the 5 vertex-transitive graphs with no Hamiltonian cycles is a Cayley graph. This observation leads to a weaker version of the conjecture:
 Every finite connected Cayley graph contains a Hamiltonian cycle.

The advantage of the Cayley graph formulation is that such graphs correspond to a finite group  and a
generating set .

Directed Cayley graph
For directed Cayley graphs (digraphs) the Lovász conjecture is false. Various counterexamples were obtained by Robert Alexander Rankin.  Still, many of the below results hold in this restrictive setting.

Special cases

Every directed Cayley graph of an abelian group has a Hamiltonian path; however, every cyclic group whose order is not a prime power has a directed Cayley graph that does not have a Hamiltonian cycle.
In 1986,  D. Witte proved that the Lovász conjecture holds for the Cayley graphs of p-groups.  It is open even for dihedral groups, although for special sets of generators some progress has been made.

When group  is a symmetric group, there are many attractive generating sets.  For example, the Lovász conjecture holds in the following cases of generating sets:
  (long cycle and a transposition).
  (Coxeter generators). In this case a Hamiltonian cycle is generated by the Steinhaus–Johnson–Trotter algorithm.
 

Stong has shown that the conjecture holds for the Cayley graph of the wreath product Zm wr Zn with the natural minimal generating set when m is either even or three. In particular this holds for the cube-connected cycles, which can be generated as the Cayley graph of the wreath product Z2 wr Zn.

General groups
For general finite groups, only a few results are known:
  (Rankin generators)
  (Rapaport–Strasser generators)
  (Pak–Radoičić generators)
  where  (here we have (2,s,3)-presentation, Glover–Marušič theorem).

Finally, it is known that for every finite group  there exists a generating set of size at most  such that the corresponding Cayley graph is Hamiltonian (Pak-Radoičić). This result is based on classification of finite simple groups.

The Lovász conjecture was also established for random generating sets of size .

References

Algebraic graph theory
Conjectures
Unsolved problems in graph theory
Finite groups
Group theory
Hamiltonian paths and cycles